Żonqor Tower, originally known as Torre di Zoncol, was a small watchtower near Żonqor Point, limits of Marsaskala, Malta. It was built in 1659 as the eleventh of the De Redin towers, on or near the site of a medieval watch post. The tower commanded the entrance to Marsaskala Bay along with Saint Thomas Tower. It was demolished by the British military in 1915 to clear the line of fire of modern fortifications.

A World War II-era pillbox now stands on the site of Żonqor Tower.

References

De Redin towers
Towers completed in 1659
Buildings and structures demolished in 1915
Demolished buildings and structures in Malta
Former towers
1659 establishments in Malta
1915 disestablishments in Malta
Buildings and structures in Marsaskala